Charles, Prince of Nassau-Usingen (31 December 1712 – 21 June 1775), was Prince of Nassau-Usingen from 1718 to 1775.

Family 
Charles was born in Usingen, the son of William Henry of Nassau-Usingen and Countess Charlotte Amalia of Nassau-Dillenburg.

After Charles' father died in 1718, Charlotte Amalia acted as regent for both Charles and his younger brother William Henry II. In 1728, Charles inherited the counties of Nassau-Ottweiler, Nassau-Idstein and Nassau-Saarbrücken from his second cousin Frederick Louis. These counties were then added to his county of Nassau-Usingen.

In 1734, he was declared an adult by Emperor Charles VI. In 1735, he and William Henry II divided their inheritance.  Charles received Usingen, Idstein, Wiesbaden and Lahr; William Henry II received Nassau-Saarbrücken and some smaller territories. He then moved his residence from Usingen in the Taunus to Schloss Biebrich in Biebrich and continued the progressive policies of his mother.

Charles died in 1775 in Biebrich and was succeeded by his son Charles William.

Marriage and issue 
On 26 December 1734 Charles married Duchess Christine Wilhelmine of Saxe-Eisenach (born: 1711), a daughter of Duke John William III. The marriage produced four children:

 Charles William (1735–1803), Prince of Nassau-Usingen
 Christine (1736–1741)
 Frederick Augustus (1738–1816), Prince of Nassau-Usingen (1803–1816) and Duke of Nassau (1806–1816)
 John Adolph (1740–1793), Prussian general

In the second, morganatic marriage, Charles married Magdalene Gross from Wiesbaden (born: 1712). From this marriage he also had four children:

 Philippa Catherine von Biebrich (born: Idstein 17 May 1744; died: 17 July 1798), married at Biebrich June 1773 to Baron Karl Friedrich von Kruse (1738–1806)
 Karl Philipp von Biebrich, Count von Weilnau (born: 25 March 1746; died: 15 August 1789 Wiesbaden). The Nassau Family Pact was executed in 1783, but he was not invited to be a signatory because of the morganatic marriage of his parents. 
 Sophie Christine (born: 20 June 1750; died: 16 November 1750)
 Wilhelm Heinrich (born: 15 February 1755; died: 6 April 1755)

Ancestry

References

Footnotes 

Counts of Nassau
Princes of Nassau
House of Nassau
1712 births
1775 deaths
18th-century German people
Recipients of the Order of the White Eagle (Poland)